is Chairman of Shimada Corporation, a management and investment consulting firm which focuses on football. Now an official advisor of INSEE Police United of Thai Premier League.

Career
1986: Graduated from Doshisha University with a bachelor's degree in Philosophy.

April 1986- August 1993: Built the first computer museum in Tokyo when working for UPU, which is a Japanese publishing company.

September 1993　- May 2000: Managed the World Tennis Championship along with variety of different football events at Diamond Agency, which is a Japanese advertising agency.

June 2000　- December 2002:  Remodeled Tokyo Verdy's branding that includes but not limited to club name and logo design.  Also relocated the club's home stadium while serving as the club's Marketing Manager.

January 2003　- July 2006: While serving as the Marketing General Manager, at Shonan Bellmare of J.League, he initiated the new marketing concept in Japan where he placed Sanno Institute of Management's (university) school name on a professional football club's jersey as its main sponsor.  Within this sponsorship deal he developed sports marketing courses for Sanno University, where he also served as a guest professor hosting a class every week. Addition to this, formed the first bridging partnership with CA Osasuna from Spanish First Division where they exchanged marketing ideas, and each clubs' staff.

2007: Published his first book "How to build Japanese original sports-clubs", and founded Shimada Corporation which is a management and investment consulting firm with the focus on professional football business. Assumed the position of Official Advisor of Sanko Partners. In 2008, consulted for two Japanese professional football clubs' investment projects.

August 2010: Assumed the position of Official Adviser as the first Japanese for INSEE Police United in Thailand Premier League.

Publication
 "How to build Japanese original sports-clubs" (Bunkasha)

References

External links
 Shimada Corporation website

1962 births
Living people
Japanese businesspeople